The following radio stations broadcast on FM frequency 88.1 MHz:

Argentina
 Maus in Rosario, Santa Fe
 Auténtica in La Plata, Buenos Aires
 Boedo in Buenos Aires
 Ciudad in Jujuy
 Ciudad in Reconquista, Santa Fe
 Ciudad in Tartagal, Salta
 Compacto in Chacabuco, Buenos Aires
 Formosa in Formosa
 Gospel in Buenos Aires
 Ideal in Monte Grande, Buenos Aires
 La Radio de Molinas in San Justo, Santa Fe
 LV 11 in Santiago del Estero
 Nacandpop in Córdoba
 Next in Cerrito, Entre Rios
 Noticias in Salta
 Plus in San Miguel de Tucumán, Tucumán
 Radio María in Ramos Mejía, Buenos Aires
 LRI 704 Rosales in Punta Alta, Buenos Aires

Australia
 2RDJ in Sydney
 3MFM in Latrobe Valley, Victoria

Brazil
 ZYD821 in São Paulo
 ZYD688 in Garibaldi, Rio Grande do Sul

Canada (Channel 201)

 CBAF-FM-15 in Charlottetown, Prince Edward Island
 CBAL-FM-4 in Saint John, New Brunswick
 CBEE-FM in Chatham, Ontario
 CBON-FM-18 in Sault Ste. Marie, Ontario
 CBU-2-FM in Vancouver, British Columbia
 CBXI-FM in Hinton, Alberta
 CBYI-FM in Hagensborg, British Columbia
 CFRH-FM in Penetanguishene, Ontario
 CHDO-FM in Montreal, Quebec
 CHLK-FM in Perth, Ontario
 CHRI-FM-1 in Cornwall, Ontario
 CIHO-FM-3 in Petite-Rivière-Saint-François, Quebec
 CIHO-FM-4 in Saint-Siméon, Quebec
 CILA-FM in Cookshire, Quebec
 CIND-FM in Toronto, Ontario
 CJLR-FM-3 in Prince Albert, Saskatchewan
 CJWE-FM in Calgary, Alberta
 CKDU-FM in Halifax, Nova Scotia
 CKEW-FM in Smithers, British Columbia
 CKLN-FM in Toronto, Ontario (1983–2011)
 CKSB-10-FM in Winnipeg, Manitoba
CKSS-FM in Parkland County, Alberta 
 VF2215 in Mont-Wright, Quebec
 VF2280 in Athabasca Hydro Station, Saskatchewan
 VF2424 in Sept-Îles, Quebec
 VF2467 in Squamish, British Columbia
 VF2522 in Chilliwack, British Columbia
 VF7141 in Marionville, Ontario
 VF7206 in Hawkesbury, Ontario
 VF8000 in Rock Forest, Quebec
 VF8004 in Woburn, Quebec
 VF8009 in Windsor, Quebec

China (mainland) 
 CNR The Voice of China in Nanning
 CNR Business Radio in Harbin

Dominican Republic
Primera FM at Santo Domingo

Hong Kong
 CR1, Commercial Radio Hong Kong in Mount Gough, Hong Kong

Lithuania
 XFM in Kaunas

Malaysia
 8FM in Klang Valley, Malacca and Northern Johor
 Gegar in Kota Bharu, Kelantan
 Nasional FM in Kuching, Sarawak
 Radio Klasik in Kota Kinabalu, Sabah
 Sarawak FM in Miri, Sarawak

Mexico
XHADM-FM in Ahualulco de Mercado, Jalisco
XHANC-FM in Cancún, Quintana Roo

XHDZ-FM in Córdoba, Veracruz
XHGIK-FM in Frontera, Coahuila
XHJM-FM in Monterrey, Nuevo León
XHÑUC-FM in Chalcatongo de Hidalgo/San Agustín Tlacotepec, Oaxaca

XHSCGB-FM in San Baltazar Chichicápam, Oaxaca
XHSCJS-FM in Tepezalá, Aguascalientes
XHRE-FM in Celaya, Guanajuato
XHRED-FM in Mexico City
XHRMO-FM in Hermosillo, Sonora
XHYAM-FM in José María Morelos, Quintana Roo
XHZN-FM in Zamora, Michoacán

New Zealand
Various low-power stations up to 1 watt

Nigeria
 Broadcasting Corporation of Abia State (BCA) Radio, Umuahia, Abia
 Gravity FM, Igboho, Oyo
 Smash FM Abeokuta, Abeokuta, Ogun
 Sunshine FM 88.1, Potiskum, Yobe

Philippines
 DWJE in Dagupan
 DXPE in Malaybalay

United Kingdom
 BBC Radio 2 (Argyll & Bute, Cirencester, Clyro Powys, Cumbria, Deiniolen, Devon, Essex, Grantham, Islay, Llanidloes, Mallaig, North Uist, Portree, S.W. London and Surrey, Snowdonia)

United States (Channel 201)

  in Grand Junction, Colorado
 KAKI in Juneau, Alaska
  in Forrest City, Arkansas
 KATG (FM) in Athens, Texas
 KAWD-LP in Detroit Lakes, Minnesota
  in Sunnyside, Washington
  in Jena, Louisiana
 KBAP in Batesville, Arkansas
 KBBG in Waterloo, Iowa
 KBCU in North Newton, Kansas
  in Hampton, Arkansas
 KBTL in El Dorado, Kansas
 KCEP (FM) in Las Vegas, Nevada
 KCFD in Crawford, Nebraska
  in Yuma, Arizona
 KCGS-FM in Marshall, Arkansas
  in Hastings, Nebraska
  in Columbia, Missouri
 KCRY in Mojave, California
 KCTI-FM in Gonzales, Texas
  in Chevak, Alaska
  in Riverton, Wyoming
  in Ellensburg, Washington
 KDDF in Mecca, California
  in Saint Louis, Missouri
  in Baker, Oregon
  in Glenwood Springs, Colorado
  in Des Moines, Iowa
  in Cedarville, California
 KEBR in Sacramento, California
  in El Cerrito, California
 KENE in Eagle Tail, New Mexico
  in Fresno, California
 KFGR in Powell, Wyoming
  in Ponca, Nebraska
 KFPS in False Pass, Alaska
 KFRI (FM) in Stanton, Texas
  in Pasadena, Texas
 KGFJ (FM) in Belt, Montana
  in Gallup, New Mexico
 KGIF (FM) in Tafuna, American Samoa
 KGKV in Doss, Texas
 KGLL in Gillette, Wyoming
 KGNZ in Abilene, Texas
 KGRH in Loomis, South Dakota
 KGRI (FM) in Lebanon, Oregon
 KGVA in Fort Belknap Agency, Montana
 KHID in Mcallen, Texas
 KHJR in St. Thomas, Missouri
  in Barrigada, Guam
 KHOY in Laredo, Texas
  in Honolulu, Hawaii
 KHTU in Wray, Colorado
  in Fort Dodge, Iowa
 KIDS (FM) in Grants, New Mexico
 KIYU-FM in Galena, Alaska
 KJDR in Guymon, Oklahoma
 KJKR in Jamestown, North Dakota
 KJTY in Topeka, Kansas
 KJVL (FM) in Hutchinson, Kansas
  in Long Beach, California
  in Pocola, Oklahoma
 KKWV in Aransas Pass, Texas
 KKWY in Wheatland, Wyoming
 KLBD in Premont, Texas
  in Bend, Oregon
 KLBT in Beaumont, Texas
 KLFC (FM) in Branson, Missouri
  in Florence, Oregon
  in Mammoth, Arizona
 KLUW in East Wenatchee, Washington
  in Lompoc, California
 KLWL in Chillicothe, Missouri
  in Ralston, Nebraska
  in Roseburg, Oregon
 KMPZ in Salida, Colorado
  in Moore, Oklahoma
 KNKL in Ogden, Utah
  in Round Rock, Texas
  in Tularosa, New Mexico
  in Whiteriver, Arizona
 KNSQ in Mount Shasta, California
 KNTU in Mckinney, Texas
 KOFK-FM in Bozeman, Montana
 KOGJ in Kenai, Alaska
 KOIA in Storm Lake, Iowa
 KOYA in Rosebud, South Dakota
  in Plaquemine, Louisiana
 KPFZ-FM in Lakeport, California
  in Pleasant Grove, Utah
  in Pagosa Springs, Colorado
 KPPP-LP in Fargo, North Dakota
 KPRQ in Sheridan, Wyoming
 KQCF in Chiloquin, Oregon
 KQHR in The Dalles, Oregon
 KQMD in Quemado, Texas
  in Quincy, California
  in Gleneden Beach, Oregon
 KQTO in Hurley, New Mexico
 KQUE-FM in Bay City, Texas
 KRBP in Presidio, Texas
 KREE in Pirtleville, Arizona
 KRFI in Redwood Falls, Minnesota
 KRLP in Windom, Minnesota
  in Northfield, Minnesota
 KRNM in Chalan Kanoa-Saipan, Northern Mariana Islands
 KRQA in Bentonville, Arkansas
 KRRB in Kuna, Idaho
  in Sioux Falls, South Dakota
 KRTM in Banning, California
 KRTT in Great Bend, Kansas
  in Anchorage, Alaska
  in San Rafael, California
  in Kennewick, Washington
  in Buhl, Idaho
 KTFZ in Thompson Falls, Montana
 KTQQ in Elko, Nevada
 KTUA in Coweta, Oklahoma
  in Lubbock, Texas
 KUCC in Clarkston, Washington
 KUHU in Monticello, Utah
  in Flora Vista, New Mexico
  in Hotevilla, Arizona
 KVAM in Cheyenne, Wyoming
 KVDM in Hays, Kansas
 KVED in Vernon, Texas
 KVJS in Arroyo, Texas
 KVLW in Waco, Texas
  in Lakewood, Colorado
 KVSC in Saint Cloud, Minnesota
 KWAO in Vashon, Washington
 KWAS in Borger, Texas
 KWOU in Woodward, Oklahoma
 KWTF in Bodega Bay, California
  in Eugene, Oregon
 KXBT in Somerville, Texas
 KXEM in Roundup, Montana
 KYRS in Medical Lake, Washington
 KYTR in Union Gap, Washington
 KZCK in Colby, Kansas
  in Santa Cruz, California
 WAJC in Newport, Minnesota
  in Jackson, Tennessee
  in Valhalla, New York
  in Mount Sterling, Kentucky
  in Geneseo, Illinois
  in Auburn, Kentucky
  in West Palm Beach, Florida
  in Harvest, Alabama
  in Thomasville, Georgia
  in Savannah, Tennessee
  in Spencerville, Ohio
  in Bloomfield Hills, Michigan
  in New Berlin, Pennsylvania
 WBGU (FM) in Bowling Green, Ohio
 WBGY in Naples, Florida
  in Gaylord, Michigan
  in Crete, Illinois
  in Worcester, Massachusetts
 WCQS in Asheville, North Carolina
  in Jacksonville, Florida
 WCRP in Guayama, Puerto Rico
 WCRX (FM) in Chicago, Illinois
  in Brookville, New York
  in Danville, Kentucky
 WDIY in Allentown, Pennsylvania
 WDNJ in Hopatcong, New Jersey
  in Dayton, Ohio
 WDSW-LP in Cleveland, Mississippi
  in Erie, Pennsylvania
  in Providence, Rhode Island
  in Bloomington, Illinois
  in Middletown, Connecticut
 WFGU-LP in Winchester, Ohio
 WFHL in New Bedford, Massachusetts
  in Nashville, Tennessee
  in Lockwoods Folly Town, North Carolina
  in Liberty, New York
 WGWS in St. Mary's City, Maryland
 WHHN in Hollidaysburg, Pennsylvania
  in Green Bay, Wisconsin
  in Ocala, Florida
 WHJL in Merrill, Wisconsin
  in Hampton, Virginia
  in Highland Park, Michigan
 WHRL in Emporia, Virginia
 WHRQ in Sandusky, Ohio
  in Goodland Township, Michigan
 WIHM-FM in Harrisburg, Illinois
 WIID in Rodanthe, North Carolina
  in Bradenton, Florida
 WJJJ in Beckley, West Virginia
  in Cape May Court House, New Jersey
  in Warm Springs, Georgia
  in Lancaster, Wisconsin
 WJYJ in Hickory, North Carolina
 WJZZ in Montgomery, New York
 WKEL in Webster, New York
 WKGO in Murrysville, Pennsylvania
  in Westerly, Rhode Island
  in Clarksburg, West Virginia
  in Raleigh, North Carolina
 WKRE in Argo, Alabama
  in Versailles, Indiana
  in Somerset, Kentucky
 WKWP in Williamsport, Pennsylvania
 WLGH in Leroy Township, Michigan
 WLHV in Annandale-on-Hudson, New York
  in Lockport, Illinois
 WLTL in La Grange, Illinois
  in Petersburg, Illinois
 WLWX in Wheaton, Illinois
  in Savannah, Georgia
  in Meridian, Mississippi
  in Mitchell, Indiana
 WMBR in Cambridge, Massachusetts
 WMEK in Kennebunkport, Maine
 WMEY in Bowdoin, Maine
  in Pike Creek, Delaware
 WMKJ in Tavernier, Florida
  in Monroe, Connecticut
 WMTG-LP in Mount Gilead, North Carolina
 WMTQ in Elmira, New York
  in Huntington, West Virginia
 WMWK in Milwaukee, Wisconsin
 WNAP-FM in Morristown, Indiana
  in New Albany, Indiana
 WNBV in Grundy, Virginia
  in Norwich, Vermont
 WNEE in Patterson, Georgia
  in Berlin, New Jersey
  in Trenton, New Jersey
  in Decatur, Illinois
  in Winnetka, Illinois
 WOLM in D'Iberville, Mississippi
 WOPR in Madison, North Carolina
  in Philadelphia, Pennsylvania
 WPRZ-FM in Brandy Station, Virginia
  in Olney, Illinois
 WQWA-LP in Columbus, Wisconsin
  in Lexington, Kentucky
  in Sweet Valley, Pennsylvania
  in Homestead, Florida
 WRIH in Richmond, Virginia
  in Sumter, South Carolina
 WRJS in Soperton, Georgia
 WRQV in Ridgway, Pennsylvania
 WRSN in Lebanon, Tennessee
  in Clemson, South Carolina
 WSDP in Plymouth, Michigan
 WSFP in Harrisville, Michigan
 WSJL in Bessemer, Alabama
 WSLZ in Cape Vincent, New York
 WSMF in Monroe, Michigan
  in Spring Valley, Illinois
 WSQN in Greene, New York
 WSRC (FM) in Waynetown, Indiana
  in Slippery Rock, Pennsylvania
  in Benton, Kentucky
 WTSQ-LP in Charleston, West Virginia
 WTZI in Rosemont, Illinois
 WUBA in High Springs, Florida
  in Jamestown, New York
 WUBK in Enoree, South Carolina
  in Holly Springs, Mississippi
 WUTC in Chattanooga, Tennessee
 WUWF in Pensacola, Florida
  in Elkhart, Indiana
 WVRR in Point Pleasant, West Virginia
 WVVC-FM in Dolgeville, New York
 WVYC in York, Pennsylvania
 WWEN in Wentworth, Wisconsin
 WWER in Colonial Beach, Virginia
 WWFJ in East Fayetteville, North Carolina
 WWGV in Grove City, Ohio
 WWTG in Carpentersville, Illinois
  in Brentwood, New York
  in Peru, New York
 WXTC in Greenville, Pennsylvania
 WYCE in Wyoming, Michigan
 WYFY in Cambridge, Ohio
  in Asbury Park, New Jersey
  in Frederick, Maryland
  in Baltimore, Maryland
 WYSP (FM) in Dushore, Pennsylvania
 WYTR in Robbins, North Carolina
 WZBL (FM) in Barnegat Light, New Jersey
  in Charleston, Illinois
  in Akron, Ohio
 WZUM-FM in Bethany, West Virginia
  in Harrisburg, Pennsylvania
  in Warwick, Pennsylvania

References

External link 
VF2522-FM History – Canadian Communication Foundation

Lists of radio stations by frequency